The 2021 Internationaux de France was the fifth event in the 2021–22 ISU Grand Prix of Figure Skating, a senior-level international invitational competition series. It was held at the Patinoire Polesud in Grenoble on November 19–21. Medals were awarded in the disciplines of men's singles, women's singles, pairs, and ice dance. Skaters earned points toward qualifying for the 2021–22 Grand Prix Final.

Entries 
The International Skating Union announced the preliminary assignments on June 29, 2021.

Changes to preliminary assignments

Results

Men

Women

Pairs

Ice dance

References

External links 
 Internationaux de France at the International Skating Union
 Results

2021 Internationaux de France
2021 in figure skating
2021 in French sport
November 2021 sports events in France
Sports competitions in Grenoble